Ten ships of the Royal Navy have borne the name HMS Blanche:

  was a 36-gun fifth rate captured from the French in 1779.  She foundered in 1780.
  was a 32-gun fifth rate launched in 1786, at Bursledon and wrecked in 1799 off Holland. 
  was a 36-gun fifth rate launched in 1800 and captured and burnt in 1805 by four French ships off Puerto Rico. 
 HMS Blanche was a 38-gun fifth rate, previously the Spanish ship Amfitrite. She was wrecked off Ushant in 1807. 
 HMS Blanche was a 28-gun sixth rate, previously the French privateer Bellone.
  was a 46-gun fifth rate launched in 1819.  She was used as a receiving hulk at Portsmouth from 1852 until she was broken up in 1865. 
  was an  wooden screw sloop, launched in 1867 and sold in 1886.
  was a  scout cruiser launched in 1909 and sold in 1921.
  was a  launched in 1930 and sunk in 1939.

Royal Navy ship names